The 2003 FIVB Women's World Cup was held from 1 to 15 November 2003 in Japan. Twelve women's national teams played in cities all over Japan for the right to a fast lane ticket into the 2004 Summer Olympics.

Teams were made up as follows: hosts Japan, continental champions and vice-champions from Europe, Asia, NORCECA and South America, continental champion from Africa, and two wild-card teams nominated jointly by the FIVB and the Japan Volleyball Association. Teams played a single-round robin format (66 games overall), in two parallel groups (site A and site B). The women played in Tokyo, Kagoshima, Nagoya, Toyama, Sapporo, Sendai, and Osaka.

Teams

  — Host
  — African Champions
  — Asian Champions
  — European Champions
  — NORCECA Champions
  — South American Champions

  — Asian bronze medalists
  — European Vice-champions
  — NORCECA Vice-champions
  — South American Vice-champions
  — Wild-card
  — Wild-card

Squads

Results

|}

All times are Japan Standard Time (UTC+09:00).

First round

Site A
Venue: Yoyogi National Gymnasium, Tokyo

|}

Site B
Venue: Kagoshima Arena, Kagoshima

|}

Second round

Site A
Venue: Nagoya Rainbow Hall, Nagoya

|}

Site B
Venue: Sendai Gymnasium, Sendai

|}

Third round

Site A
Venue: Hokkaido Prefectural Sports Center, Sapporo

|}

Site B
Venue: Toyama City Gymnasium, Toyama

|}

Fourth round

Site A
Venue: Namihaya Dome, Kadoma

|}

Site B
Venue: Osaka Prefectural Gymnasium, Osaka

|}

Final standing

Awards

 Most Valuable Player
  Małgorzata Glinka
 Best Scorer
  Małgorzata Glinka
 Best Spiker
  Zhao Ruirui
 Best Blocker
  Valeska Menezes
 Best Server
  Zoila Barros

 Best Receiver
  Zhou Suhong
 Best Libero
  Arlene Xavier
 Best Setter
  Fernanda Venturini
 Special Award
  Yoshie Takeshita

External links
 FIVB 2003 World Cup

2003 Women's
Women's World Cup
V
V
November 2003 sports events in Asia
Women's volleyball in Japan